FC Bayern Munich won the German double for the second time in three seasons, ensuring the first season for Felix Magath as manager was a successful one. With several German clubs suffering from financial difficulties at the time, the title race was a casual stroll for Bayern's star-filled squad, winning by 14 points, since sole rival Schalke 04 fell apart in the last month of the season. Among the key players in the success were Roy Makaay and playmaker Michael Ballack.

First-team squad

Left club during season

Results

Bundesliga

League table

DFB-Pokal

Matches

DFB-Ligapokal

Champions League

Group stage

Round of 16

Quarter-finals

Statistics

Top scorers
  Roy Makaay 22 (3)
  Michael Ballack 13
  Claudio Pizarro 11
  Paolo Guerrero 6
  Sebastian Deisler 4
  Zé Roberto 4

Sources
RSSSF - Germany 2004/05

FC Bayern Munich seasons
Bayern Munich
German football championship-winning seasons